Ceryx chea is a moth of the subfamily Arctiinae. It was described by Herbert Druce in 1895. It is found on the Philippines.

References

Ceryx (moth)
Moths described in 1895